John Dee Holeman  (April 4, 1929April 30, 2021) was an American Piedmont blues guitarist, singer, and songwriter. His music includes elements of Texas blues, R&B and African-American string-band music. In his younger days he was also known for his proficiency as a buckdancer.

Early life
Holeman was born in Hillsborough, North Carolina. on April 4, 1929.  He was raised on a farm in Orange County.  He learned to play the guitar, and listened to traveling bluesmen from other parts of the South, as well as on the radio.  Drawing inspiration from Blind Boy Fuller, he began singing and playing guitar at local parties and other community events by the time he was in his mid-teens.  He went on to purchase his first electric guitar during his mid-twenties.  Holeman relocated to Durham, North Carolina, in 1954, where he played with the pianist Fris Holloway. The duo became adept at the Juba dance, also known as the hambone or buckdance, which he had earlier learned at country dances.

Career
During his working lifetime, Holeman had full-time employment as a construction worker, and music was a part-time pursuit.  However, he was able to tour in the United States and overseas in the 1980s, including performances at Carnegie Hall, and abroad on behalf of the United States Information Agency's Arts America program.  He played at the 42nd National Folk Festival at Wolf Trap, Virginia, in 1980. He performed yearly at the Black Banjo Festival, in Boone, North Carolina. His first album, Bull City After Dark, was nominated for a W. C. Handy award (a predecessor of the Blues Music Awards). He recorded the album Bull Durham Blues in 1988, which featured Taj Mahal. It was re-released on the Music Maker label in 1999. Also in 1988, the National Endowment for the Arts presented Holeman with a National Heritage Fellowship.

Holeman was presented with the North Carolina Folk Heritage Award in 1994. A song Holeman wrote, "Chapel Hill Boogie", was featured on the 2007 Grammy Award–nominated album 10 Days Out: Blues from the Backroads, recorded by Kenny Wayne Shepherd.

In 2007, Music Maker issued the album John Dee Holeman & the Waifs Band, on which Holeman was backed by the Waifs, an Australian folk-rock group.  He played several shows in 2018 with Cajun/Zydeco musician Mel Melton in Durham.

Personal life
Holeman was married to Joan until his death.  He died on April 30, 2021, at the age of 92.

Discography

See also
List of Piedmont blues musicians

References

External links
John Dee Holeman talks about building a guitar out of a cigar box and screen door wire. NAMM Oral History Library (2013)
 
 

1929 births
2021 deaths
American blues guitarists
American male guitarists
American blues singers
Songwriters from North Carolina
Singers from North Carolina
People from Hillsborough, North Carolina
Piedmont blues musicians
Guitarists from North Carolina
National Heritage Fellowship winners
20th-century American guitarists
Musicians from Durham, North Carolina
20th-century American singers
20th-century American male singers
21st-century American guitarists
21st-century American singers
21st-century American male singers
American male songwriters